The Fylde Coast derby is the name given to the regional football rivalry between the two Football League clubs situated in the Fylde Coast area of Lancashire – Blackpool and Fleetwood Town, first contested in 1980.

The rivalry between Blackpool and Fleetwood Town started very recently, dating back to 2015–16 Football League One, after Blackpool were relegated from 2014–15 Football League Championship. The two clubs have met a total of 13 times in all competitions, with Blackpool winning seven games compared to Fleetwood's solitary victory.

All-time results

League

Cups

Head-to-head ranking in League One

• Total: Blackpool 3 times higher, Fleetwood Town 2 times higher.

References

Blackpool F.C.
Fleetwood Town F.C.
England football derbies